The Yidgha language is an Eastern Iranian language of the Pamir group spoken in the upper Lotkoh Valley (Tehsil Lotkoh) of Chitral in the Khyber Pakhtunkhwa province of Pakistan. Yidgha is similar to the Munji language spoken on the Afghan side of the border.

The Garam Chashma area became important during the Soviet invasion of Afghanistan because the Soviets were unable to stop the flow of arms and men back and forth across the Dorah Pass that separates Chitral from Badakshan in Afghanistan. Almost the entire Munji-speaking population of Afghanistan fled across the border to Chitral during the War in Afghanistan.

Study 
The Yidgha language has not been given serious study by linguists, except that it is mentioned by Georg Morgenstierne (1926), Kendall Decker (1992) and Badshah Munir Bukhari (2005). A 280-page joint description of Yidgha and Munji (descriptive and historical phonetics and grammar, glossary with etymologies where possible) is given by Morgenstierne (1938).

Norwegian linguist Georg Morgenstierne wrote that Chitral is the area of the greatest linguistic diversity in the world. Although Khowar is the predominant language of Chitral, more than ten other languages are spoken here. These include Kalasha-mun, Palula, Dameli, Gawar-Bati, Nuristani, Yidgha, Burushaski, Wakhi, Kyrgyz, the Madaglashti dialect of Persian, and Pashto. Since many of these languages have no written form, letters are usually written in Urdu.

See also
Languages of Pakistan

References

Further reading
 
Morgenstierne, Georg (1926) Report on a Linguistic Mission to Afghanistan. Instituttet for Sammenlignende Kulturforskning, Serie C I-2. Oslo. 
Morgenstierne, Georg (1938) Indo-Iranian Frontier Languages II (Yidgha-Munji, Sanglechi-Ishkashmi and Wakhi). Instituttet for Sammenlignende Kulturforskning, Serie B: XXXV. Oslo.
 Decker, Kendall D. (1992). Languages of Chitral (Sociolinguistic Survey of Northern Pakistan, 5). National Institute of Pakistani Studies, 257 pp. .

Languages of Chitral
Pamir languages
Endangered Iranian languages
Languages of Khyber Pakhtunkhwa